Charles Gresford Edmondes (1838–1893) was an archdeacon and college principal.

He was the son of Thomas Edmondes  the vicar of Cowbridge; his uncle was Charles Williams (1806–1877), who later became principal of Jesus College, Oxford; his brother, Frederick William Edmondes (1841–1918) became archdeacon of Llandaff.

He was educated at Sherborne and Trinity College, Oxford, where he graduated with a first in classical moderations in 1856. After some years as Curate of Bridgend, he was, from 1865 to 1881, professor of Latin at St David's College, Lampeter (now part of University of Wales Trinity Saint David). After vicariates at Boughrood, Radnorshire (1881), and Warren, Pembrokeshire (1882-8) he was, in 1883, made Archdeacon of St David's.

He resigned his office in 1888 to become principal of St David's College, and remained there until his health broke down in 1892. He died on 18 July 1893.

He was for many years an assiduous member of the Cambrian Archaeological Association.

References

Articles on Charles Gresford Edmondes by Robert Thomas Jenkins in '‘The Dictionary of Welsh Biography'’, The Honourable Society of Cymrodorion, 1959.

1838 births
1893 deaths
People educated at Sherborne School
Academics of the University of Wales, Lampeter
Alumni of Trinity College, Oxford
Archdeacons of St Davids
Principals of St David's College